"Virginia Plain" is a song by English rock band Roxy Music, released as their debut single in August 1972. Written by Roxy frontman Bryan Ferry, the song was recorded by the band in July 1972 at London's Command Studios. Backed with "The Numberer", an instrumental composed by Andy Mackay, as a single the song became a Top 10 hit in the UK, peaking at number four.

The song was not included on the band's original UK debut album, Roxy Music, having not even been recorded when the album was released. After the success of the album in the UK, it was included on later re-issues. In 1977, it was re-released as a single, together with "Pyjamarama", originally the second Roxy Music single, to promote the Greatest Hits album, and reached number 11. Both "Virginia Plain" and "The Numberer" can be found on the 1995 The Thrill of it All boxset.

"Virginia Plain" features bass guitarist Rik Kenton, who joined after Graham Simpson left the band. It begins with a deceptively quiet introduction, followed by an instant increase of volume as soon as the vocals come in on the first verse.

Former art student Ferry took the title "Virginia Plain" from one of his own paintings, featuring an image of cigarette packaging - "Virginia Plain" is a variety of cigarette tobacco. Ferry later said in an interview:
It was a watercolour or a painting on paper. It was just like a surreal drawing of a giant cigarette packet, with a pin-up girl on it. I liked that phrase Virginia Plain…so it later became the title of the first single I put out with Roxy Music – with a slightly imponderable lyric...
The name "Robert E. Lee" refers to music industry lawyer Robert Lee, practising at London law firm Harbottle & Lewis at the time. Warhol superstar Baby Jane Holzer is also referenced in the lyrics "Baby Jane's in Acapulco / We are flying down to Rio" and "can't you see that Holzer mane?".

Phil Manzanera's guitar solo was improvised. He later claimed he played the first thing that came into his head.

Reception 
In 2021, Rolling Stone ranked the song at number 348 in their updated list of the 500 Greatest Songs of All Time.

Musicians
Bryan Ferry - vocals, piano, Mellotron, harmonica (on "The Numberer")
Andy Mackay - oboe, saxophone
Brian Eno - VCS3 synthesizer, treatments
Paul Thompson - drums
Phil Manzanera - electric guitar
Rik Kenton - bass guitar

In popular culture
 Virgin Atlantic operated a Boeing 747-400 aircraft named Virginia Plain from 1997 to 2013 with tail registration G-VTOP.
 In the Sex Pistols documentary The Filth and the Fury, Sex Pistols guitarist Steve Jones mentions Roxy Music as a major childhood influence while a part of the Top of the Pops performance of "Virginia Plain" is shown. Jones later appeared in the 2009 BBC film More Than This - The Story of Roxy Music, discussing the same thing.
 The song's performance on Top of the Pops has been parodied on Shooting Stars and Big Train in which it is sung by Mao Zedong from his deathbed.
 The song is featured prominently in Todd Haynes's 1998 film Velvet Goldmine.

References

1972 debut singles
Roxy Music songs
Songs written by Bryan Ferry
1972 songs
E.G. Records singles
Island Records singles
Reprise Records singles